The flag of Anjouan was adopted in 2012. It is a red field with a centered white crescent moon and four white stars.

Historical flags

References

External links 
 Gouvernorat de l'Île Autonome d'Anjouan
 

2012 establishments in the Comoros
Flags introduced in 2012
Anjouan
Anjouan
Anjouan
Comorian culture